James Douglas Fleck,  (born February 10, 1931), sometimes known as Jim Fleck, is a Canadian businessman and academic.

Personal
Fleck was born in Toronto, Ontario, Canada on February 10, 1931, to Robert Douglas and Norma Marie Fleck.

He married Margaret Evelyn Fleck (née Humprhys) in 1953. They have four children—Robert, Ellen, David and Christopher, five grandchildren and one great-granddaughter. In 1982, Margaret was ordained as a priest in the Anglican Church of Canada and has had an active career as a minister and certified chaplain.

Fleck is interested in the arts, is a private collector, and in sports, particularly tennis.

Education

Fleck was educated at the University of Toronto Schools. He earned a BA (Gold Medalist 1953) from the University of Western Ontario, where he received an entrance scholarship for best marks in mathematics and science. In 1964, he attended Harvard University  as a Ford Foundation fellow. At Harvard, he was awarded a doctorate of business administration in finance (DBA 1964) with a doctoral thesis on the investment policies of Canadian life insurance companies. In June 2002, he was awarded a degree of Doctor of Laws honoris causa by the University of Toronto and in September 2010, he was awarded the degree of Doctor of Sacred Letters honoris causa (DSL) by the University of Trinity College.

Career

Business
Chairman and CEO of Fleck Manufacturing Inc., a company he founded in 1954, manufacturer of wire and cable, power cords and wiring assemblies for the appliance, automotive and electronic industries with plants in Canada, Mexico and the US, until it was acquired by Noma Industries Limited in August 1994.

Director and executive committee member of CUC Ltd., a private cable TV company, until it was acquired by Shaw Cable in May 1995. He was also chairman of Alias Research Inc., 3D computer graphics software company, until it was acquired by Silicon Graphics Inc. in June 1995. He was also chairman of ATI Technologies Inc until its acquisition by Advanced Micro Devices in 2006.

Director of Promis Systems Corporation Limited until it was acquired by PRI Automation in March, 2000. He was a director of many other public and private companies including Certicom Inc., Rogers Multimedia Ltd., Zurich Insurance, Travellers Insurance, Channel 47 Inc., Colonial Homes Ltd. He was once the chairman of NGRAIN Corporation, Vancouver, a provider of 3D simulation solutions for maintenance and training in the defense industry.

Fleck was also active in the Young Presidents' Organization and was its international president in 1972-73.

Controversy

Fleck was not CEO of Fleck Manufacturing during the Fleck Strike of 1978, which is considered important for a variety of reasons—including raising "women's issues" to new importance in union politics—but it was also a reaction against extremely poor working conditions.

At the time of this strike, Fleck was either the full time Deputy Minister of Industry and Tourism in Toronto or the  Visiting Professor of Canadian Studies, Business and Public Management, at the John F. Kennedy School of Government at Harvard University in Cambridge, Mass during that entire period.

For more details on the strike see Backhouse, Constance, The Fleck Strike: A Case Study in the Need for First Contract Arbitration (December 1, 1980). Osgoode Hall Law Journal 18 (1980) 495-553.

Academic

Fleck was on the faculty of the Harvard Business School teaching first-year finance in the MBA Program, 1964-1966. From 1966-1970, he was professor and associate dean, Faculty of Administration Studies and director, M.B.A. program at York University.

He has also taught, as a visiting professor, at the Keio University Business School of Tokyo; INSEAD (The European Institute of Business Administration in Fontainebleau, France) and the University of Western Ontario, as well as teaching courses in corporate finance, business policy and business/government relations.

From July 1978 for 12 months he was the William Lyon Mackenzie King Visiting Professor of Canadian Studies, Business and Public Management, at the John F. Kennedy School of Government at Harvard University.

Professor Fleck is the emeritus M. Wallace McCutcheon Professor of Business Government Relations at the Faculty of Management, University of Toronto and a senior fellow, Massey College.

His publications include Business Can Succeed!, Understanding the Political Environment (with A. Litvak, Canada Publishing Corporation), Canada Can Compete!, Strategic Management of the Canadian Industrial Portfolio (with J.R. D'Cruz), Institute for Research on Public Policy, and Yankee Canadians in the Global Economy, Strategic Management of U.S. Subsidiaries under Free Trade. He has co-authored with Professor J. D'Cruz several articles for Business Quarterly, one of which, "The Globalization of Manufacturing", received the Silver Medal in the Deloitte & Touche "Best of the Best" Awards covering the first thirty years of the Business Quarterly.

Government

From 1969-1971 was executive director and member of the Committee on Government Productivity, responsible for carrying out a study that led to a major re-organization of the Ontario Government. Prior to joining COGP, he served on the Federal Department of Transport Task Force on goals and objectives.
	
During 1974 and 1975 was the secretary of the cabinet and for the two previous years CEO, Office of the Premier, Government of Ontario. From January 1, 1976, until September 1, 1978, he was deputy minister of Industry and Tourism, Government of Ontario.

He was a founding director of the Public Policy Forum, was active in the Niagara Institute and chairman of BCNI's Steering Committee on Constitutional Reform, and was a director of the Institute for Research on Public Policy.

In 2013 he was awarded the title of "Legend of the OPS" with a square on the Ontario Public Service quilt dedicated in his honour. In May 2014, he was awarded the Lieutenant Governor's Medal of Distinction in Public Service, Ontario's highest honour for public service.

He was presented the Queen's Silver Jubilee Medal in 1977, the Queen's 50th Anniversary Medal in 2002, and the Queen's Diamond Jubilee Medal in 2012.

Fleck as appointed an Officer of the Order of Canada in 1997 and promoted to Companion to the Order of Canada in 2015.

References

External links
 AMD Board of Directors profile
 The Edmund C. Bovey Award For Leadership Support of the Arts
 Rotman School of Management profile
 U of T Magazine
 http://www.ipacontariomedalofdistinction.ca
 https://archive.today/20150208015719/http://members.afptoronto.org/index.php/news-and-annoucements/2013/10/9/638
 http://www.ispa.org/?awards
 http://www.gg.ca/document.aspx?id=15922
 http://www.ggpaa.ca/en/nfb_short_films.html

1930s births
Living people
Canadian Anglicans
20th-century Canadian civil servants
Canadian corporate directors
Businesspeople from Toronto
Harvard Business School alumni
Companions of the Order of Canada
Academic staff of the University of Toronto
University of Western Ontario alumni
Place of birth missing (living people)
Ford Foundation fellowships